LP Andromedae (often abbreviated to LP And) is a carbon star in the constellation Andromeda. It is also a Mira variable whose mean apparent visual magnitude is 15.12 and has pulsations with an amplitude of 1.50 magnitudes and a period of 614 days.

In 1974 LP Andromedae, known then as IRC+40540, was identified as a carbon star and also shown to be variable.  It had previously been suspected of variability during the 2 Micron All Sky Survey (2MASS).  A detailed study of its spectrum showed an unusually cool star with a basic class of C8, and Swan band strength of 3.5.  It also showed strong C13 isotopic bands.  The period was narrowed down to around 614 days, one of the longest periods known for a Mira variable.

This star has a dusty envelope with an estimated mass of 3.2 , fueled by the star itself which is losing mass at a rate 1.9 /yr. Such a high mass loss rate should place LP Andromedae close to the end of its asymptotic giant branch evolution. The envelope extends to a distance of 3 parsec from the star, and is mainly made of silicon carbide and carbon particles.

References

Andromeda (constellation)
Andromedae, LP
J23342752+4333012
Carbon stars
IRAS catalogue objects
Emission-line stars